Makunda is a village in Ghanzi District of Botswana. It is located close to the Namibian border. The population was 331 in 2001 census.

References

Ghanzi District
Villages in Botswana